Larry William Jacobsen (born August 30, 1975) is a former professional first baseman and designated hitter. He also attended Hermiston High School in Oregon.

Career
Jacobsen was drafted out of Lewis-Clark State College in the 7th round of the 1997 Major League Baseball Draft by the Milwaukee Brewers. After six years in the Brewers organization, advancing as high as Triple-A, Jacobsen was released by the Brewers on June 15, . On June 25, 2002, the St. Louis Cardinals signed Jacobsen, assigning him to their Double-A affiliate, the New Haven Ravens. Jacobsen was granted free agency after the  season and signed with the Seattle Mariners on November 10, 2003.

Jacobsen spent the  season with the Mariners Triple-A affiliate, the Tacoma Rainiers, batting .312 with 26 home runs and 86 RBIs. He also won the Pacific Coast League Home Run Derby. His performance earned Jacobsen a call up on July 16, where he maintained his impressive power, hitting 9 home runs in only 160 at bats. A knee injury sidelined Jacobsen for most of September, eventually resulting in arthroscopic surgery on it on May 12, 2005. This caused him to miss the season, and not appear in any major league games in 2005. On February 26, Jacobsen signed a minor league contract with the Chicago White Sox; however, Jacobsen was released before playing any games for the White Sox. He spent 2006 playing for the Long Island Ducks of the independent Atlantic League of Professional Baseball, batting .291 with 21 home runs and 89 RBI. After failing to sign with another big-league team, Jacobsen retired from baseball.

Jacobsen is currently part of the KJR 93.3 FM Chuck and Buck morning show. He previously appeared on Seattle Q13 Fox station doing Mariners post-game coverage. He also coaches the 13U, 14U, and 15U Snoqualmie Valley Bucks select baseball teams in Snoqualmie, Washington, while running a facility called Bucky's Baseball Academy.

References

External links
, or Baseball Almanac, or Retrosheet, or Pura Pelota (Venezuelan Winter League) 

1975 births
Living people
American expatriate baseball players in Mexico
Arizona League Mariners players
Baseball players from Wyoming
Beloit Snappers players
People from Hermiston, Oregon
Huntsville Stars players
Indianapolis Indians players
Inland Empire 66ers of San Bernardino players
Lewis–Clark State Warriors baseball players
Long Island Ducks players
Major League Baseball first basemen
Mexican League baseball first basemen
New Haven Ravens players
Ogden Raptors players
Olmecas de Tabasco players
Pastora de los Llanos players
People from Riverton, Wyoming
Seattle Mariners players
Stockton Ports players
Tacoma Rainiers players
Tennessee Smokies players
Tiburones de La Guaira players
American expatriate baseball players in Venezuela
Yaquis de Obregón players